Logan Wilson (born July 8, 1996) is an American football linebacker for the Cincinnati Bengals of the National Football League (NFL). He played college football at Wyoming and was drafted by the Bengals in the third round of the 2020 NFL Draft.

Early life and high school
Wilson grew up in Casper, Wyoming and attended Natrona County High School, where he played defensive back, wide receiver, placekicker and punter on the football team. He was named first-team All-State as a placekicker as a sophomore and as a junior and at safety, wide receiver and punter as a junior. As a senior, Wilson recorded six interceptions and five passes broken up on defense, 29 catches for 493 yards and seven touchdowns on offense and was again named first-team All-State at safety, wide receiver and punter and helped lead the Mustangs to a 12-0 record and a state title. He committed to play college football at Wyoming with his only other scholarship offer being Weber State.

College career
Wilson redshirted his true freshman season. As a redshirt freshman, Wilson made 94 tackles, 7.5 tackles for loss and three sacks with seven passes defended, three interceptions with one returned for a touchdown, a forced fumble and three fumble recoveries with one returned for a touchdown and was named the Mountain West Conference Freshman of the Year. Wilson posted 119 tackles, eight tackles for loss, a sack, two forced fumbles and a fumble recovery with an interception and two passes defended in his redshirt sophomore season and was named honorable mention All-Mountain West. He was again named honorable mention All-Mountain West as a redshirt junior after making 103 tackles with two sacks and 11 tackles for loss while breaking up four passes with two interceptions. As a senior, Wilson made 105 tackles with 8.5 tackles for loss and a sack with four interceptions (one returned for a touchdown), 11 passes broken up and a forced fumble and was named first-team All-Mountain West and a second-team All-American by USA Today. Wilson finished his collegiate career with 421 tackles (fourth-most in school history), 35 tackles for loss and seven sacks with 24 passes defended, ten interceptions, four forced fumbles, four fumbles recovered and three defensive touchdowns.

Professional career

Cincinnati Bengals

2020
Wilson was selected by the Cincinnati Bengals with the 65th pick in the third round of the 2020 NFL Draft. He made his debut in the opening game of 2020, recording two tackles as a reserve linebacker against the Los Angeles Chargers. In Week 3 against the Philadelphia Eagles, Wilson recorded his first career interception off a pass thrown by Carson Wentz during the 23–23 tie game. In Week 8 against the Tennessee Titans, Wilson recorded his first career sack on Ryan Tannehill during the 31–20 win.

2021

Wilson was named the starting middle linebacker for the Bengals heading into the 2021 season. In week two against the Chicago Bears Wilson had his first interception of the season against Bears rookie quarterback Justin Fields in a 20-17 loss at Soldier Field.  On September 26, 2021, Wilson intercepted Pittsburgh Steelers quarterback Ben Roethlisberger twice to go with a game high 14 tackles in route to a 24-10 victory for the Bengals at Heinz Field in week 3.  Wilson finished the season with 4 interceptions, the most on the team. In the AFC Divisional round against the top seeded Tennessee Titans, Wilson intercepted a tipped throw from Ryan Tannehill mid-field, which set up an eventual game winning field goal by Evan McPherson, giving the Bengals their first  road playoff win in franchise history, 19-16.

2022 
Wilson played in 15 games and led the team in tackles with 123, while also forcing 1 fumble and intercepting one pass, which he returned 41 yards.  In the Bengals wildcard playoff win over the Baltimore Ravens, he forced a fumble from Tyler Huntley on the Bengals 1-yard line that teammate Sam Hubbard recovered and returned 98 yards for a touchdown.

NFL Career statistics

Regular season statistics

Playoffs statistics

References

External links
Cincinnati Bengals bio
Wyoming Cowboys bio

1996 births
Living people
Players of American football from Wyoming
Sportspeople from Casper, Wyoming
American football linebackers
Wyoming Cowboys football players
Cincinnati Bengals players
Ed Block Courage Award recipients